The Louisiana Limestone is a geologic formation in Missouri. It preserves fossils dating back to the Devonian period.

See also

 List of fossiliferous stratigraphic units in Missouri
 Paleontology in Missouri

References
 

Devonian Missouri